The Dallas Connection is a 1994 action adventure film starring Bruce Penhall, Mark Barriere and Julie Strain. It was written and directed by Christian Drew Sidaris and is the tenth installment in the Triple B series produced by Andy Sidaris.

Cast
 Bruce Penhall as Chris Cannon
 Mark Barriere as Mark Austin
 Julie Strain as "Black Widow"
 Rodrigo Obregon as Antonio Morales
 Samantha Phillips as Samantha Maxx (Sam Phillips)
 Kym Malin as Cowboy's Hostess

Triple B Series 
This film is considered to be the tenth installment in the Andy Sidaris Triple B Series of films.

See also
Girls with guns

References

External links
 
 
 

1994 films
1990s action adventure films
1990s English-language films
American spy action films
American action adventure films
1990s American films